Stuttaford's was a chain of upscale department stores in South Africa, Botswana and Namibia that operated for 159 years from 1858 through 2017. It was nicknamed the "Harrod's of South Africa". At closing it had seven stores in South Africa, two in Botswana, and one in Namibia. It continues to operate in Namibia only.

History
Founder Samson Rickard Stuttaford opened his first shop in 1857 in Cape Town city centre. His son was Richard Stuttaford (b. 1870) was a prominent businessman and entered the firm in 1886. In 1859 Povall & Stuttaford was established. In 1868 the company Thorne, Stuttaford & Co. was established in collaboration with William Thorne. 

Its main Cape Town store at the corner of Adderley and Hout streets, opened in 1938, was designed by in-house Harrods architect Louis David Blanc, echoing the style of the London department store's buildings. 

In 1978, Graham Beck's Kangra Holdings bought Stuttafords, which at that point had five stores, for 12 million rand. On 24 August 1979 the company was delisted from the stock exchange. Beck stripped the assets, selling the transport and warehousing operations for 10 million rand.

In 1983 he sold the Durban branch to Garlicks. In 1986 he sold Stuttaford's 45% share in Cavendish Square shopping centre. in 1987 he sold the Cape Town Adderley Street flagship store to Unidev for 11 million rand. The store closed 18 April 1987.

In 1987, what remained of Stuttafords, which by then also included the remaining John Orr's and Garlicks store branches, was sold to Greatermans, another department store, which was part of Kirsh Trading, later Tradegro. The John Orr's and Garlicks branches were rebranded Stuttafords which then had 8 branches. Pepkor acquired Stuttafords in 1992 along with Ackermans, Checkers and Cashbuild. In 1998 Pepkor announced that it planned to sell Stuttafords and focus on its core business, serving low- to lower-middle-income consumers. In 2000, taking control in a deal worth 106 million rand were: the management (35%) and staff (15%) of Stuttafords, and African Merchant Bank Private Equity Partners (AMB PEP, 50%): AMB PEP would later sell to the store management.

In 2000 Stuttafords moved from a model of a complete traditional staid department store to that of a contemporary, specialty department store focusing on apparel, cosmetics and "soft" home goods such as bed and bath linens.

In 2008, under CEO Marco Cicoria, the store pivoted again, aiming to be the country's leading retailer selling international upmarket brands such as Tommy Hilfiger, Ted Baker, Gap and Banana Republic. This proved to be fatal when in 2015 an economic crisis and reduction in the value of the rand versus the U.S. dollar (on top of a 45% import duty) made the upmarket products extremely expensive in the local currency. Attempts at a bailout failed and in July 2017 the chain closed, except for the Windhoek, Namibia store which was sold off and remains in operation.

Cape Town Flagship
The store at Adderley and Hout streets was the largest and grandest, and formed the central shopping district together with other now-closed department stores such as Garlicks and Fletcher & Cartwright's. In 1957, 993 employees worked here both in the retail store operation and in the head office. 

The flagship was a complete department store, as opposed to the smaller department stores focusing on apparel and soft home goods that it would operate starting around the turn of the 21st century. As of 1970, the flagship carried: 
 Women's and men's apparel and accessories;
 Cosmetics, Childrenswear, Luggage;
 Home crafts (Dress Fabrics, Paper Patterns, Sewings, Notions, Trimmings, Buttons, Wools, Needlework)
 Home furnishings (Carpets, Furniture, Bedding, Garden (including some Sports), Fabrics Lamps, Towels, Napery, Linens, Blankets, Dinnerware, Ornaments, Glassware, Cutlery, Ovenware, Kitchenware, Hardware, Gardening, Electrical, Radio, Gifts, Candles);
 Sundries (Curios, Photographic, Stationery, Books, Records;
 Gourmet food hall selling Groceries, Frozen Goods, Fish, Cakes, Sweets, and Smokers' Requisites. 
 There were two restaurants: Adderley Restaurant and the self-serve Bird Cage restaurant.
 There were additional concession spaces.

Branches
In 2006, Stuttafords had the most stores in its history, 22 in total. In 2009, to restructure to international standards, it closed smaller stores in Somerset West, Woodhill and Hyde Park. Some other stores were downsized or closed before liquidation in 2017, as shown in the table.

Source: John Marwood, The History of Stuttafords Department Stores

External links
John Marwood, The History of Stuttafords Department Stores of South Africa 1858 - 2017: Expansion, Takeovers, Makeovers, Collapse
"The Story of Stuttaford's" (blog)

Bibliography
 (Book) Stuttaford & Co. Ltd., Gill Fraser (ed.), The Story of Stuttafords, Cape Press, 1957. 55 pp.
 (E-book) John Marlow, The History and Evolution of Stuttafords Department Stores of South Africa 1858 - 2015

References
 John Marwood, The History of Stuttafords Department Stores

Department stores of South Africa
Retailing in Namibia
Retailing in Botswana
Retailing in Kenya